Germania Flugzeugwerke GmbH was a German aircraft manufacturer during World War I. The company was established in 1914 at Leipzig.  During 1915 and 1916, the company produced license built Rumpler C.I reconnaissance biplanes for the Luftstreitkräfte at Leipzig-Mockau Airport. The company also repaired other types of aircraft and maintained their own flight school to train pilots.  with an approval for the civil aviation: DFW C V, Ru. C I a, Germ. C IV. There were 17 aircraft of the Germania Reichsluftamt aircraft works when approved.

The company was liquidated in 1922 after the Treaty of Versailles.

References 

Defunct aircraft manufacturers of Germany
Vehicle manufacturing companies established in 1914
1914 establishments in Germany
Vehicle manufacturing companies disestablished in 1922
1922 disestablishments in Germany